James Taylor Jones (July 20, 1832 – February 15, 1895) was a U.S. Representative from Alabama.

Biography
Born in Richmond, Virginia, Jones moved with his family to Marengo County, Alabama, in 1834.
He pursued classical studies and graduated from Princeton College in 1852 and from the law school of the University of Virginia at Charlottesville in 1855.
He was admitted to the bar in 1856 and commenced his law practice in Demopolis, Alabama.
During the Civil War, Jones enlisted in the Confederate States Army as a private in the Fourth Alabama Regiment.

Jones was elected captain of Company D in this regiment in 1862.
He was appointed judge advocate general in the Confederate War Department in 1864 and served until the close of the war.
He served as a delegate to the State constitutional convention in 1865.
He ran for the State Senate in 1872, but lost in a contested election.
He was an unsuccessful candidate for election in 1874 to the Forty-fourth Congress when he ran against Republican Charles Hays.

However, Jones was elected as a Democrat to the Forty-fifth Congress (March 4, 1877 – March 3, 1879). He was an unsuccessful candidate for reelection in 1878 to the Forty-sixth Congress.

Jones was elected to the Forty-eighth Congress to fill the vacancy caused by the death of Thomas H. Herndon.
He was reelected to the Forty-ninth and Fiftieth Congresses and served from December 3, 1883, to March 3, 1889.
He was not a candidate for renomination in 1888.
He resumed the practice of law in Demopolis, Alabama.
Jones was elected Circuit judge of the first judicial circuit of Alabama from 1890 until his death in Demopolis, Alabama, January 15, 1895.
He was interred in Lyon Cemetery.

References

1832 births
1895 deaths
Princeton University alumni
University of Virginia School of Law alumni
Politicians from Richmond, Virginia
People from Demopolis, Alabama
Confederate States Army officers
Democratic Party members of the United States House of Representatives from Alabama
19th-century American politicians